Gabriel Valdés Subercaseaux (July 3, 1919 – September 7, 2011) was a Chilean politician, lawyer and diplomat.  Valdes served as the Minister of Foreign Affairs of Chile under President Eduardo Frei Montalva from 1964 to 1970. A vocal opponent of the military dictatorship of Augusto Pinochet, which held power from 1973 to 1990, Valdés worked for Chile's transition to democracy.

Valdes served as President of the Senate of Chile, considered the second most important office in the country after the presidency, from 1990 to 1996. He retired from the Senate in 2006.

Gabriel Valdés died from bronchitis on September 7, 2011, at his home in Santiago, Chile, at the age of 92. He had recently been admitted as a patient at Clínica Alemana for treatment of a long illness.

Gabriel Valdés married composer Sylvia Soublette in 1946. Their sons are Juan Gabriel Valdés, former Chile's Ambassador to the United States, and Maximiano Valdés, musician and conductor, former music director of the Buffalo Philharmonic Orchestra.

References

1919 births
2011 deaths
Presidents of the Senate of Chile
Members of the Senate of Chile
Foreign ministers of Chile
Christian Democratic Party (Chile) politicians
Chilean diplomats
Pontifical Catholic University of Chile alumni
Candidates for President of Chile
20th-century Chilean lawyers